The following is a list of medical schools (or universities with a medical school) in Europe.

Armenia
 Yerevan State Medical University
 University of Traditional Medicine
 St. Theresa's Medical University of Yerevan

Albania
Public
University of Medicine, Tirana – Faculty of Medicine
Private
Catholic University "Our Lady of Good Counsel" - Faculty of Medicine

Austria
Medical University of Innsbruck
Karl Landsteiner University of Health Sciences
The Faculty of Medicine at the Johannes Kepler University Linz
Medical University of Graz
Medical University of Vienna
Paracelsus Medical University, Salzburg and Nuremberg

Belarus
Belarusian State Medical University, Minsk (Belarusian: Беларускі дзяржаўны медыцынскі ўніверсітэт)
Gomel State Medical University (Belarusian: Гомельскі дзяржаўны медыцынскі ўніверсітэт)
Grodno State Medical University (Belarusian: Гродненскі дзяржаўны медыцынскі ўніверсітэт)
Vitebsk State Order of Peoples' Friendship Medical University (Belarusian: Віцебскі дзяржаўны медыцынскі ўніверсітэт)

Belgium
In order of creation
 Faculty of Medicine and Dental Sciences, Université catholique de Louvain – Brussels (1425)
 Faculty of Medicine, Katholieke Universiteit Leuven – Leuven (1425)
 Faculty of Medicine, University of Liège – Liège (1817)
 Faculty of Medicine and Rehabilitation Sciences, Ghent University – Ghent (1817)
 Faculty of Medicine, Université libre de Bruxelles – Brussels (1848)
 Faculty of Medicine, University of Namur – Namur (1962)
 Faculty of Medicine and Pharmacy, Vrije Universiteit Brussel – Brussels (1971)
 Faculty of Medicine and Health Sciences, University of Antwerp – Antwerp (1972)
 Faculty of Medicine and Life Sciences, Hasselt University – Hasselt (1973)
 Faculty of Medicine and Pharmacy, University of Mons – Mons (1973)

Bosnia and Herzegovina
Faculty of Medicine, University of Banja Luka
Faculty of Medicine, University of East Sarajevo
Faculty of Medicine, University of Mostar
Faculty of Medicine, University of Sarajevo, taught also in English (public)
Faculty of Medicine, University of Tuzla
Sarajevo Medical School, taught in English (private)
International University of Goražde, taught in English (private)

Bulgaria
Medical University Pleven – Faculty of Medicine
Medical University of Plovdiv
Medical University of Sofia – Faculty of Medicine
Medical University of Varna – Faculty of Medicine
Sofia University – Faculty of Medicine
Trakia University of Stara Zagora – Faculty of Medicine

Croatia
School of Medicine, Juraj Dobrila University of Pula
School of Medicine, University of Osijek
School of Medicine, University of Rijeka
School of Medicine, University of Split
School of Medicine, University of Zagreb

Cyprus
Medical School, University of Cyprus
Saint George's Medical School in Cyprus
School of Medicine, European University Cyprus
 University of Nicosia Medical School
Near East University, Faculty of Medicine

Czech Republic
Charles University has three faculties in Prague and two outside:
Charles University in Prague, First Faculty of Medicine
Charles University in Prague, Second Faculty of Medicine
Charles University in Prague, Third Faculty of Medicine
Charles University, Faculty of Medicine in Hradec Králové
Charles University, Faculty of Medicine in Pilsen
 Faculty of Military Health Sciences, University of Defence , Brno
Masaryk University, Faculty of Medicine
Palacký University of Olomouc, Faculty of Medicine and Dentistry, taught also in English
University of Ostrava, Faculty of Medicine

Denmark
Aalborg University, Faculty of Health Sciences
Aarhus University, Health
University of Copenhagen Faculty of Health and Medical Sciences
University of Southern Denmark, Faculty of Health Sciences, Odense

Estonia
University of Tartu, Faculty of Medicine

Finland
University of Eastern Finland – School of Medicine, Kuopio
University of Helsinki – Faculty of Medicine
University of Oulu – Faculty of Medicine
University of Tampere – Faculty of Medicine
University of Turku – Faculty of Medicine

France
Many French universities have a medical school, called UFR de Médecine, where UFR stands for Unité de Formation et de Recherche, or "Unit for training and research" in English.
Aix-Marseille University, Marseille
University of Angers
University of Antilles-Guyane
Victor Segalen Bordeaux 2 University
University of Burgundy
University of Western Brittany
University of Caen Lower Normandy
University of Auvergne (Clermont-Ferrand I)
University of Franche-Comté
Joseph Fourier University (Grenoble I)
Université Lille Nord de France – Campus Lille II
Faculte Libre de Medecine (Lille)
University of Limoges
Claude Bernard University Lyon 1, two UFR of Medicine: Lyon Est and Lyon Sud
Jean Monnet University (Saint-Étienne)
University of Montpellier 1
Henri Poincaré University (Nancy I)
University of Nantes
University of Nice Sophia Antipolis
University of New Caledonia – only the first year
Paris Descartes University (Paris 5)
Pierre and Marie Curie University (Paris 6)
Paris Diderot University (Paris 7)
Paris-Sud 11 University
Paris 12 Val de Marne University
Paris 13 University (Paris North)
University of Picardy-Jules Verne (Amiens)
University of Poitiers
University of Reims Champagne-Ardenne
University of Rennes 1
University of Rouen
University of Strasbourg
Paul Sabatier University (Toulouse III), two UFR – Purpan and Rangueil
François Rabelais University (Tours)
Versailles Saint-Quentin-en-Yvelines University

Georgia
 BAU International University, Batumi
 David Tvildiani Medical University, Tbilisi
 Tbilisi State Medical University, Georgia
 Petre Shotadze Tbilisi Medical Academy
 New Vision University, Tbilisi, Georgia
 Akaki Tsereteli State university, Kutaisi, Georgia
 Ivane Javakhishvili Tbilisi State University, Georgia
 David Aghmashenebeli University of Georgia, Tbilisi, Georgia
 European University Faculty of Medicine
 Georgian American University Tbilisi, Georgia
 Tbilisi Open Teaching University, Tbilisi, Georgia
 University of Georgia, Tbilisi, Georgia

Germany

Baden-Württemberg
 Albert Ludwig University of Freiburg
 Ruprecht Karl University of Heidelberg
 Faculty of Medicine Mannheim, University of Heidelberg
 Eberhard Karl University of Tübingen
 University of Ulm

Bavaria
 Friedrich-Alexander University of Erlangen and Nürnberg
 Ludwigs-Maximilians University of Munich (LMU)
 Technical University of Munich, School of Medicine
 University of Regensburg
 Julius Maximilian University of Würzburg

Berlin
 Charité – University Medicine Berlin of Freie Universität Berlin and the Humboldt University of Berlin
 Universitätsklinikum Benjamin Franklin, Berlin (since 2003 merged with Charité)

Bremen

Hamburg
 University of Hamburg (University Medical Center Hamburg-Eppendorf)

Hessen
 Johann Wolfgang von Goethe University of Frankfurt am Main
 Justus-Liebig-Universität Gießen
 Philipps University of Marburg

Mecklenburg-Vorpommern
 Faculty of Medicine, University of Greifswald
 Medizinische Fakultät, Universität Rostock, Rostock

North Rhine-Westphalia
 Rhenish Westphalian Technical University of Aachen
 University Hospitals of the Ruhr-Universität Bochum
 Rhenish Friedrich Wilhelm University of Bonn
University of Cologne
 Heinrich-Heine University of Düsseldorf
University of Duisburg-Essen, Essen
 Westphalian University of Münster
 Witten/Herdecke University

Lower Saxony
 Georgia-Augusta University of Göttingen
 Medical University of Hannover (MHH)
 University of Oldenburg, European Medical School

Rhineland-Palatinate
 Johannes Gutenberg University of Mainz

Saarland
Universitat des Saarlandes, Saarbrücken/Campus Homburg

Saxony-Anhalt
 Otto-Guericke-University of Magdeburg
 Martin-Luther University of Halle and Wittenberg

Saxony
 Dresden (TU)
Leipzig University

Schleswig-Holstein
 Christian-Albrecht University of Kiel
 Medical University of Lübeck

Thuringia
 Friedrich Schiller University Jena

Private
 Asklepios Medical School
 University Targu Mures Medical Campus Hamburg (medical faculty of the University of Medicine, Pharmacy, Science and Technology of Târgu Mureș)

Greece
University of Athens
University of Crete
University of Ioannina
University of Patras
University of Thessaloniki
University of Thessaly
University of Thrace

Hungary
University of Szeged Medical school
Semmelweis University of Medical Sciences Budapest
University of Debrecen Medical School
University of Pécs Medical School

Iceland
University of Iceland

Ireland
National University of Ireland, Galway
Royal College of Surgeons in Ireland
Trinity College Dublin
University College Cork
University College Dublin
University of Limerick

Italy

Public

Abruzzo 
 D'Annunzio University of Chieti–Pescara (Chieti)
 University of L'Aquila (L'Aquila)

Apulia 
 University of Bari (Bari and Taranto)
University of Bari - taught in English
 University of Foggia

Calabria 
 University of Catanzaro

Campania 
University of Naples
University of Naples - taught in English
University of Naples II (Caserta and Naples)
University of Naples II - taught in English (Naples)
University of Salerno (Baronissi)

Emilia-Romagna 
 University of Bologna (Bologna, Forlì, Ravenna)
University of Bologna - taught in English
 University of Ferrara
 University of Modena and Reggio Emilia (Modena)
 University of Parma

Friuli-Venezia Giulia 
University of Trieste
University of Udine

Lazio 
University of Rome La Sapienza (Rome)
University of Rome La Sapienza (Latina)
University of Rome La Sapienza - taught in English 
University of Rome Tor Vergata
University of Rome Tor Vergata - taught in English

Liguria 
 University of Genoa

Lombardy 

University of Brescia
University of Milan
University of Milan, taught in English
University of Milan - Bicocca (Monza)
University of Milan - Bicocca, taught in English in Bergamo
University of Insubria (Como and Varese)
University of Pavia 
University of Pavia, taught in English

Marche 
 Marche Polytechnic University (Ancona) (1970)

Molise 
 University of Molise (Campobasso)

Piedmont 
 University of Eastern Piedmont (Alessandria and Novara)
University of Turin (Turin)
University of Turin, taught in English in Orbassano

Sardinia 
 University of Cagliari
 University of Sassari

Sicily 
 University of Catania
University of Messina
 University of Messina, taught in English
University of Palermo (in Palermo; in Caltanissetta)

Trentino Alto Adige 

 University of Trento

Tuscany 
 University of Florence
 University of Pisa
 University of Siena

Umbria 

 University of Perugia (Perugia and Terni)

Veneto 
 University of Padova (Padua and Treviso)
 University of Verona

Private or parochial

Lazio 
 Biomedical University of Rome (Catholic)
Saint Camillus International University of Health and Medical Sciences, Rome - taught in English
 Universita Cattolica del Sacro Cuore, Rome - taught in English (Catholic)

Lombardy 
Humanitas University, in Pieve Emanuele, taught in English
Vita-Salute San Raffaele University, Milan (Catholic)
Vita-Salute San Raffaele University, Milan - in English (Catholic)

Sicily 

 Kore University of Enna, Enna

Kosovo
Public
University of Pristina - Faculty of Medicine (Universiteti i Prishtines – Fakulteti i Mjekesise)

Latvia
Riga Stradiņš University
University of Latvia

Lithuania
Lithuanian University of Health Sciences
Vilnius University – Faculty of Medicine

Republic of North Macedonia
 St. Cyril and Methodius University – Skopje, Faculty of Medicine
Goce Delčev University of Štip – Faculty for Medical Sciences
State University of Tetovo - Faculty of Medical Sciences | (Universiteti Shteteror i Tetoves; Univerzitet vo Tetovo)

Malta
EDU, Faculty of Medicine and Health
University of Malta, Faculty of Medicine & Surgery

Moldova
The State Medical and Pharmaceutical University "Nicolae Testemiţanu"

Montenegro
University of Montenegro – Faculty of Medicine

Netherlands
Universiteit van Amsterdam, Faculty of Medicine / Academic Medical Center
Vrije Universiteit Amsterdam, Faculty of Medicine / VU University Medical Center
University of Groningen, Faculty of Medicine / University Medical Center Groningen
Leiden University, Faculty of Medicine / Leiden University Medical Center
Universiteit Maastricht, Faculty of Health, Medicine and Life Sciences / Maastricht UMC+
Radboud University Nijmegen, Faculty of Medicine / Radboud University Medical Center
Erasmus University Rotterdam, Faculty of Medicine / Erasmus University Medical Center
Utrecht University, Faculty of Medicine / University Medical Center Utrecht
Saba University School of Medicine
International University School of Medicine

Norway
Norwegian University of Science and Technology, Faculty of Medicine (in Trondheim)
University of Bergen
University of Oslo, Faculty of Medicine
 The National Hospital (Rikshospitalet)
 University Hospital, includes Gaustad Hospital, Norway's oldest psychiatric hospital
University of Tromsø - The Arctic University of Norway
 The first four pre-clinical years at the University of Tromsø
 The last two clinical years may be finished at either University Hospital of Northern Norway Tromsø (UNN Tromsø), Nordland Hospital Bodø or Finnmark Hospital Hammerfest.

Poland
Jagiellonian University Medical College in Kraków (Collegium Medicum Uniwersytetu Jagiellonskiego)
Medical University of Białystok (Uniwersytet Medyczny w Białymstoku)
Collegium Medicum in Bydgoszcz of the Nicolaus Copernicus University in Toruń (Collegium Medicum w Bydgoszczy Uniwersytetu Mikołaja Kopernika w Toruniu)
Medical University of Gdańsk (Gdański Uniwersytet Medyczny)
Medical University of Silesia in Katowice (Śląski Uniwersytet Medyczny w Katowicach)
Medical University of Lublin (Uniwersytet Medyczny w Lublinie)
Medical University of Łódź (Uniwersytet Medyczny w Łodzi)
Poznań University of Medical Sciences (Uniwersytet Medyczny w Poznaniu)
Pomeranian Medical University in Szczecin (Pomorski Uniwersytet Medyczny w Szczecinie)
Medical University of Warsaw (Warszawski Uniwersytet Medyczny)
Wrocław Medical University (Uniwersytet Medyczny we Wrocławiu)
Collegium Medicum of the University of Warmia and Mazury in Olsztyn (Collegium Medicum Uniwersytetu Warmińsko-Mazurskiego w Olsztynie)
Collegium Medicum of the University of Zielona Góra (Collegium Medicum Uniwersytetu Zielonogórskiego)
Faculty of Medicine and Health Sciences of the Jan Kochanowski University in Kielce (Wydział Lekarski i Nauk o Zdrowiu Uniwersytetu Jana Kochanowskiego w Kielcach)
Faculty of Medicine of the University of Rzeszów (Wydział Medyczny Uniwersytetu Rzeszowskiego)
Faculty of Medicine and Health Sciences of the Andrzej Frycz Modrzewski Krakow University (Wydział Lekarski i Nauk o Zdrowiu Krakowskiej Akademii im. Andrzeja Frycza Modrzewskiego)
Faculty of Health Sciences and Physical Culture of the Kazimierz Pułaski University of Technology and Humanities in Radom (Wydział Nauk o Zdrowiu i Kultury Fizycznej Uniwersytetu Technologiczno-Humanistycznego im. Kazimierza Pułaskiego w Radomiu)
Faculty of Natural Sciences and Technology of the University of Opole (Wydział Przyrodniczo-Techniczny Uniwersytetu Opolskiego)
Faculty of Medicine of the Lazarski University in Warsaw (Wydział Medyczny Uczelni Łazarskiego)
Faculty of Medical Sciences of the Katowice School of Technology (Wydział Nauk Medycznych Wyższej Szkoły Technicznej w Katowicach)
Faculty of Medicine. Collegium Medicum of the Cardinal Stefan Wyszyński University in Warsaw (Wydział Medyczny. Collegium Medicum Uniwersytetu Kardynała Stefana Wyszyńskiego w Warszawie)

Portugal
 Universidade Nova de Lisboa, NOVA Medical School (Universidade Nova de Lisboa, Faculdade de Ciências Médicas)
 University of Algarve, Biomedical Sciences and Medicine Department (Universidade do Algarve, Departamento de Ciências Biomédicas e Medicina)
 University of Beira Interior, Faculty of Health Sciences (Universidade da Beira Interior, Faculdade de Ciências da Saúde)
 University of Coimbra, Faculty of Medicine (Universidade de Coimbra, Faculdade de Medicina)
 University of Lisbon, Faculty of Medicine (Universidade de Lisboa, Faculdade de Medicina)
 University of Minho, School of Health Sciences (Universidade do Minho, Escola de Ciências da Saúde)
 University of Porto, Faculty of Medicine (Universidade do Porto, Faculdade de Medicina)
 University of Porto, Institute of Biomedical Sciences Abel Salazar (Universidade do Porto, Instituto de Ciências Biomédicas Abel Salazar)

Romania
University of Medicine and Pharmacy "Grigore T. Popa", Iași (Universitatea Grigore T. Popa de Medicină şi Farmacie din Iaşi)
University of Medicine and Pharmacy "Carol Davila", Bucharest (Universitatea de Medicina si Farmacie Carol Davila)
University of Medicine and Pharmacy "Iuliu Hatieganu", Cluj-Napoca (Universitatea de Medicină şi Farmacie Iuliu Hatieganu)
University of Oradea, (Universitatea din Oradea-Facultatea de Medicina si Farmacie)
Victor Babeș University of Medicine and Pharmacy, Timișoara (Universitatea de Medicină şi Farmacie "Victor Babeș" Timișoara)
Transylvania University of Brașov- Faculty of Medicine (Universitatea Transilvania din Brașov – Facultatea de Medicina)
University of Medicine and Pharmacy of Târgu Mureş (Universitatea de Medicină şi Farmacie din Târgu-Mureş), in Hungarian language also
University of Medicine and Pharmacy of Craiova (Universitatea de Medicină şi Farmacie din Craiova)
Lucian Blaga University of Sibiu - Faculty of Medicine (Universitatea "Lucian Blaga" din Sibiu)
Ovidius University, Constanța - Faculty of Medicine (Universitatea Ovidius Constanța )
Titu Maiorescu University - Faculty of Medicine Bucharest (Universitatea "Titu Maiorescu" Bucuresti) - Facultatea de medicina
Vasile Goldiş West University of Arad – Faculty of Medicine (Facultatea de Medicină, Farmacie și Medicină Dentară a Universității de Vest "Vasile Goldiș" Arad)
University of Galați - Faculty of Medicine and Pharmacy (Universitatea „Dunărea de Jos” din Galați ) - Facultatea de medicina si farmacie

Russia

 First Moscow State Medical University
 First Pavlov State Medical University of Saint Peterburg, Saint Petersburg
 Izhevsk State Medical Academy
 Kursk State Medical University
 Moscow State University, Faculty of Fundamental Medicine
 Mordovian State University named after N.P. Ogarev, Saransk
 Northern State Medical University, Arkhangelsk
 North-West State Medical University named after I. I. Mechnikov, Saint Petersburg
 Novosibirsk State University - V. Zelman Institute for Medicine and Psychology
 Novosibirsk State Medical University
 Omsk State Medical University
 People's Friendship university - Institute of Medicine
 Privolzhsky Research Medical University, Nizhny Novgorod
 Rostov State Medical University, Rostov-on-Don
 Russian National Research Medical University, Moscow
 Ryazan State Medical University named after I.P. Pavlov
 Saint Petersburg State University - Faculty of Medicine
 Samara State Medical University
 Saratov State Medical University named after V.I. Razumovsky
 Siberian State Medical University, Tomsk
 Smolensk State Medical University
 Tver State Medical University
 Ural State Medical University, Yekaterinburg
 Volgograd State Medical University
 Voronezh State Medical University named after N. N. Burdenko

Serbia
University of Belgrade School of Medicine, Belgrade
University of Novi Sad – Faculty of Medicine Novi Sad
University of Nis – Faculty of Medicine, Nis
University of Kragujevac – Faculty of Medicine, Kragujevac

Slovakia
Comenius University – (Faculty of Medicine, Bratislava; Jessenius Faculty of Medicine, Martin)
Slovak Medical University – Bratislava
Faculty of Medicine, Pavol Jozef Šafárik University – Košice

Slovenia
University of Ljubljana – Faculty of Medicine
University of Maribor – Faculty of Medicine

Spain
 Universidad de Alcalá - Facultad de Medicina, Alcalá de Henares
 Universidad Alfonso X El Sabio:  Facultad de Ciencias de la Salud, Madrid
 Universitat Autònoma de Barcelona: Facultad de Medicina, Cerdanyola del Vallès
 Universidad Autónoma de Madrid: Facultad de Medicina, Madrid
 Universitat de Barcelona - Facultad de Medicina, Barcelona
 Universidad de Cádiz - Facultad de Medicina, Cádiz
 Universidad de Cantabria - Facultad de Medicina, Santander, Spain
 University of Castilla–La Mancha: Facultad de Medicina, Albacete
 University of Castilla–La Mancha: Facultad de Medicina, Ciudad Real
 Valencia Catholic University Saint Vincent Martyr: Facultad de Psicología y Ciencias de la Salud, Valencia
 CEU San Pablo University:  Facultad de Medicina, Madrid/Alcorcón
 Universidad CEU Cardenal Herrera: Facultad de Medicina, Castellón de la Plana
 Universidad Complutense de Madrid - Facultad de Medicina, Madrid
 Universidad de Córdoba - Facultad de Medicina, Córdoba
 University of the Basque Country:  Facultad de Medicina y Odontología, Leioa
 Universidad Europea de Madrid: Facultad de Medicina, Villaviciosa de Odón
 Universidad de Extremadura - Facultad de Medicina, Badajoz
 Universidad Francisco de Vitoria:  Facultad de Ciencias de la Salud, Pozuelo de Alarcón
 Universitat de Girona: Facultad de Medicina, Girona
 Universidad de Granada - Facultad de Medicina, Granada
 Universitat Internacional de Catalunya:  Facultad de Medicina y Ciencias de la Salud, Sant Cugat del Vallès
 Universidad de La Laguna - Facultad de Medicina, San Cristóbal de La Laguna and Santa Cruz de Tenerife
 Universidad de Las Palmas de Gran Canaria:  Facultad de Ciencias de la Salud, Las Palmas De Gran Canaria
 Universitat de Lleida:  Facultad de Medicina, Lleida
 Universidad de Málaga - Facultad de Medicina, Málaga
 Miguel Hernández University of Elche:  Facultad de Medicina, Sant Joan d'Alacant
 Universidad de Murcia - Facultad de Medicina, Murcia
 Universidad de Navarra:  Facultad de Medicina, Pamplona
 Universidad de Oviedo - Facultad de Medicina, Oviedo
 Universidad Rey Juan Carlos:  Facultad de Ciencias de la Salud, Alcorcón
 Universitat Rovira i Virgili:  Facultad de Medicina y Ciencias de la Salud, Reus
 Universidad de Salamanca:  Facultad de Medicina, Salamanca
 Universidad de Santiago de Compostela - Facultad de Medicina y Odontología, Santiago de Compostela
 Universidad de Sevilla - Facultad de Medicina, Seville
 Universidad de Valladolid - Facultad de Medicina, Valladolid
 Universitat de València - Facultad de Medicina y Odontología, Valencia
 Universidad de Zaragoza - Facultad de Medicina, Zaragoza

Sweden
Gothenburg University, Institute of Medicine
Karolinska Institutet
Linköping University, Faculty of Medicine and Health Sciences
Lund University, Faculty of Medicine
Umeå University, Faculty of Medicine
Uppsala University Faculty of Medicine
Örebro University, Faculty of Medicine and Health

Switzerland
University of Basel
University of Berne
University of Geneva
University of Fribourg
University of Lausanne
University of Zurich

Turkey
Abant Izzet Baysal University
Acıbadem University School of Medicine
Adıyaman University
Adnan Menderes University
Afyon Kocatepe University
Akdeniz University
Ankara University
Ankara Yıldırım Beyazıt University
Atatürk University
Balıkesir University
Başkent University
Bezmialem Vakif University
Biruni University
Bursa Uludağ University
Bülent Ecevit University
Celal Bayar University
Cumhuriyet University
Çanakkale Onsekiz Mart University
Çukurova University
Dicle University
Dokuz Eylül University
Dumlupınar University
Düzce University
Ege University
Erciyes University
Eskişehir Osmangazi University
Fırat University
Gazi University
Gaziantep University
Gaziosmanpaşa University
Giresun University
Gülhane Military Medical Academy
Hacettepe University
Hitit University
Harran University
İnönü University
Istanbul Bilim University
Istanbul Medipol University
Istanbul University Istanbul Medical Faculty
Istanbul University Cerrahpaşa Medical Faculty
İzmir University of Economics
Karadeniz Technical University
Kırıkkale University
Kocaeli University
Koç University
Maltepe University
Marmara University
Mersin University
Mugla Sitki Kocman University
Mustafa Kemal University
Near East University
Necmettin Erbakan University
Ondokuz Mayıs University
Pamukkale University
Selçuk University
Süleyman Demirel University
Trakya University
Ufuk University
Van Yüzüncü Yıl University
Yeditepe University

Ukraine
Uzhhorod National University
Kyiv Medical University of UAFM
Bukovinian State Medical University
 O.O. Bogomolets National Medical University
Ukrainian Medical And Dental Academy
Bogomoletz Institute of Physiology, Kiev
Crimea State Medical University
Lviv National Medical University
Dnipropetrovsk State Medical Academy
Dnipropetrovsk Medical Institute 
Donetsk National Medical University
Ivano-Frankivsk National Medical University
Vasyl Karazin Kharkiv National University, School of Fundamental Medicine 
Kharkiv Medical Academy of Post-graduate Education
Kharkiv National Medical University
Lugansk State Medical University
Odessa National Medical University
Sumy State University, medical institute
Ternopil State Medical University
Vinnytsia National Medical University. N. I. Pirogov
Zaporizhia State Medical University
The International Academy of ecology and medicine

United Kingdom

England
Anglia Ruskin University School of Medicine, Chelmsford
Aston University Medical School, Birmingham
Barts and The London School of Medicine and Dentistry, London
Brighton and Sussex Medical School, Brighton
Bristol Medical School, Bristol
Durham University School of Medicine and Health
Edge Hill University Medical School, Ormskirk
Hull York Medical School, York
Imperial College School of Medicine, London
Keele University School of Medicine
King's College London School of Medicine and Dentistry, London
Lancaster Medical School, Lancaster, Lancashire
Leeds School of Medicine, Leeds
Leicester Medical School, Leicester
Liverpool Medical School, Liverpool
Manchester Medical School, Manchester
Medical Sciences Division, University of Oxford, Oxford
Newcastle University Medical School, Newcastle upon Tyne
Norwich Medical School at the University of East Anglia, Norwich
Peninsula College of Medicine and Dentistry, Plymouth
St George's, University of London
School of Clinical Medicine, University of Cambridge, Cambridge
Sheffield Medical School, Sheffield
Southampton Medical School, Southampton
UCL Medical School, London
University of Birmingham Medical School, Birmingham
University of Buckingham Medical School, Buckingham
University of Central Lancashire School of Medicine, Preston
University of Exeter Medical School, Exeter
University of Nottingham Medical School, Derby (graduate-entry)
University of Nottingham Medical School, Lincoln
University of Nottingham Medical School, Nottingham
University of Sunderland School of Medicine, Sunderland
Warwick Medical School, Coventry

Northern Ireland
Queen's University Belfast Medical School, Belfast
Ulster University, Londonderry

Scotland
University of Aberdeen School of Medicine
University of St Andrews School of Medicine
Dundee Medical School
University of Edinburgh Medical School
Glasgow Medical School

Wales
Cardiff University School of Medicine, Cardiff
Swansea University Medical School, Swansea
North Wales Medical School, Bangor, Gwynedd (expected in September 2024)

References

English-Language European Medical Schools – ValueMD
English-Language Medical Schools in Europe – MDIS

External links
 World Directory of Medical Schools

Europe